Tyler Dow Bryant (born February 24, 1991) is an American guitarist from Paris, Texas. He is best known as the lead guitarist and vocalist of the rock band Tyler Bryant & the Shakedown.

Early and personal life
Tyler got his first guitar at the age of 6. When he was 11, he sold the dirtbike his parents had given to him for Christmas and bought his first electric guitar, a red Epiphone Les Paul from Hollybond's Music Store in Paris, Texas. While still in elementary school, he met Roosevelt Twitty, a blues musician who became Bryant's guitar teacher and mentor. At 13, Bryant and Twitty started playing shows around Texas. This was the age that Tyler also started writing songs.

At 15, Tyler put together his first band, which performed local shows in and around his hometown. In 2006, he was presented with the Robert Johnson Gibson New Generation Award for aspiring young guitar players. In 2007, Tyler won Ernie Ball's first "Play Crossroads Competition", which got him a spot performing at the Crossroads Guitar Festival in Chicago.

As Bryant's career continued, he began to take influence from blues-based rock acts, such as The Black Crowes, The Rolling Stones, Lynyrd Skynyrd, and Tom Petty and the Heartbreakers. Tyler moved to Nashville at age 17 to pursue a career in songwriting, and in the process he met drummer Caleb Crosby and bass player Calvin Webster. Caleb and Calvin joined Tyler's band, named Tyler Bryant & the Shakedown, which now also includes bass guitarist Ryan Fitzgerald and guitarist Graham Whitford (the latter being the son of Aerosmith's Brad Whitford).

On October 6, 2019 Bryant married Rebecca Lovell of Larkin Poe.

Career
In 2008, Tyler signed with John Huie at Creative Artists Agency as his booking agent. Tyler has toured with and opened shows for artists including Jeff Beck, Aerosmith, Lynyrd Skynyrd, Joe Bonamassa, B.B. King, Pat Benatar, Heart, Smash Mouth, Styx, REO Speedwagon, AC/DC, Vince Gill, Guns N' Roses and The Cadillac Three. Guitarist Vince Gill has said about Tyler, "To be 18 and play like this kid is the rarest of the rare. Hands down a future guitar god." In 2009 Tyler performed at the Grammy Foundation's 11th Annual Music Preservation Event: "Music in Focus" at the historic Wilshire Ebell Theater in Los Angeles. In 2009, he was featured, along with musicians including Jeff Beck, Carlos Santana and Slash, in the film Rock Prophecies. Tyler's song "Who I Am" is featured as downloadable content for Guitar Hero 5. Tyler performed at the 2011 Austin City Limits Music Festival.

In 2011, Bryant formed Dead Cool Dropouts with Lisa Origliasso of the Veronicas. He later contributed to their 2014 self-titled album.

Tyler has recorded with music producers Kevin Shirley (Led Zeppelin), Jed Leiber (Jeff Beck) and Roger Alan Nichols. In March 2011, Tyler released his first EP, called My Radio, which was later followed by another EP, From the Sandcastle. Tyler Bryant & the Shakedown released their debut album Wild Child on January 22, 2013. Their song "Loaded Dice & Buried Money" was available for streaming on October 13, 2015, and an EP titled The Wayside was announced with a release date of November 13, 2015. The present members of the group include Bryant (lead vocals, guitar), Graham Whitford (guitar, backing vocals), Ryan Fitzgerald (bass, backing vocals) and Caleb Crosby (drums).

Tyler has also been confirmed as a warm up artist for Guns N' Roses Not in this Lifetime Tour. He released Truth and Lies in 
2019, his third album after 2013's Wild Child and his second self-titled album

References

External links
 Tyler Bryant's website
 Link to film Rock Prophecies
 Fender Guitar Profile of Tyler Bryant
 Article from NashvilleScene.com titled Bringing Guitar Back Tyler Bryant
 Profile from Texas Music Times
 Premier Guitar article 16-Year Old to Take Stage at Crossroads Festival
 Interview with Tyler Bryant on TheWaster.com

American rock guitarists
American male guitarists
Living people
1991 births
People from Honey Grove, Texas
21st-century American guitarists
21st-century American male musicians